Astruc is a surname. Notable people with the name include:

 Abba Mari (13th century), French rabbi who took the name Astruc
 Astruc de Noves (14th century), French philosopher and physicist
 Astruc Remoch (14th century), Spanish medieval doctor
 Astruc ha-Levi (14th century), Spanish medieval scholar
 Alexandre Astruc (1923–2016), French film critic and director
 Didier Astruc, French chemist
 Gabriel Astruc (1864–1938), French theatrical impresario
 Jean Astruc (1684–1766), French medical professor
 Zacharie Astruc (1835–1907), French sculptor, painter and author

See also 
Astruc family

References 

Occitan-language surnames
Jewish surnames